Sheyann Webb-Christburg (born February 17, 1956) is a civil rights activist known as Martin Luther King Jr.'s "Smallest Freedom Fighter" and co-author of the book Selma, Lord, Selma. As a nine-year-old, Webb took part in the first attempt at the Selma to Montgomery march across the Edmund Pettus Bridge on March 7, 1965, known as Bloody Sunday.

Early life 
Webb was born on February 17, 1956, in Selma, Alabama, to John and Betty Webb. She grew up in a family of eight children. As a child, she attended the segregated public schools of Dallas County, Alabama until she was one of the first black children to integrate an all-white school where she was pushed down stairs, called derogatory names,  and spit on.

The beginning of her activism 
In January, 1965, enticed by an uncommon scenario for Alabama in the 1960s, Webb and her friend Rachel West followed a group of both black and white people into Brown's Chapel AME Church and took part in their first civil rights meeting. Webb became passionate about this activism and began skipping school and sneaking out of her house at night to attend meetings and/or demonstrations, despite her parents' warnings. She even brought home freedom fighters, like James Reeb, to stay at her house as an attempt to avoid being punished.

Webb and West met Dr. King soon after they began attending meetings. Webb states that meeting Dr. King was one of the most impactful events of her life; she describes him as "a strong...patient man...one who could talk and deliver, and you could receive his message regardless of how old you were." Webb knew little about the movement at eight years old, she "grew up in the movement and realized what was happening little by little," and claims that Dr. King was the reason she stayed involved, even beyond her childhood.

Bloody Sunday 
The march from Selma to Montgomery was organized after the death of Jimmie Lee Jackson, a member of the Southern Christian Leadership Conference (SCLC) who was beaten and shot during a peaceful march for voting rights in Marion, Alabama. Along with the aggravated murder of Jackson, the fight for voting rights was of high priority in 1965. The march across the Edmund Pettus Bridge to the state's capital in protest of the unjust treatment was set to take place on March 7, 1965.

During the meeting held prior to Bloody Sunday, people talked about the possibilities of how the march would go, and that there was a possibility that the march wouldn't be successfully finished. Webb said that she was scared the morning of the march, and that she wasn't prepared to see the things she saw, even after the warnings of the meeting the previous night.

At nine years old, marching alongside her teacher, Margaret Moore, Sheyann Webb was among the protesters who were beaten with billy clubs and gassed with tear gas. A fellow demonstrator, Hosea Williams, picked up Webb and rescued her from the violent turn of the protest. She ran home "like [she] was running for [her] life." After the first attempted march, Webb was still determined to return to Brown's Chapel Church, and she was willing to march again. She wrote her funeral arrangements the night of Bloody Sunday.

The rest of the marches 
The Selma to Montgomery marches took place from March 7 to March 25. the second attempt at the Selma to Montgomery march took place on March 9, 1965, later resulting in the murder of James Reeb, and the third and final march began on March 21, 1965. Webb participated in the last march without her parents' permission, and didn't end up marching the whole way. She was picked up in a van and driven to Montgomery with Dr. King's secretaries. Her parents were informed of her location and that she was safe, and not long after she was picked up and driven home. However, her parents' support was increasing and her father drove her back to Montgomery the next morning so she could finish the march. As a result of participating in the march, Webb was suspended from her predominantly white school.

Later activities
Because of her involvement in the Selma to Montgomery marches, and her interactions with Dr. King, she pursued both her bachelor's degree and master's degree. With Rachel West Nelson she wrote Selma, Lord, Selma, a 1980 book edited by Frank Sikora, which was adapted into a Disney television movie of the same name and found its way into secondary education textbooks.

See also
Selma to Montgomery marches
Selma, Lord, Selma

References

External links
Selma, Lord, Selma on IMDB.

1956 births
Living people
Activists from Selma, Alabama
African-American women writers
African-American writers
American writers
Activists for African-American civil rights
Selma to Montgomery marches
21st-century African-American people
21st-century African-American women
20th-century African-American people
20th-century African-American women